Sanele Mao (born ) is a Samoan weightlifter. 

Mao is from Vaitele and Falealupo. He initially pursued a career in bodybuilding, representing Samoa at a competition in New Caledonia and winning silver. In 2012 he switched to weightlifting. He participated at the 2014 Commonwealth Games in the 94 kg event. He won the silver medal at the 2016 Oceania Weightlifting Championships, lifting a total of 335 kg.

Mao won Samoa’s first gold medal at the 2018 Commonwealth Games. Mao won in the final of the 105 kg men's division during the Weightlifting on day five of the Gold Coast 2018 Commonwealth Games at Carrara Sports and Leisure Centre. In 2019 he competed at the 2019 Pacific Games, winning three gold medals. In 2020 he won the men's division in the Oceania Weightlifting Federation Online Cup.

Major competitions

References

External links

1985 births
Living people
Samoan male weightlifters
People from Vaisigano
Weightlifters at the 2014 Commonwealth Games
Commonwealth Games medallists in weightlifting
Commonwealth Games gold medallists for Samoa
Medallists at the 2018 Commonwealth Games